Indosylvirana sreeni, also known as Sreeni's golden-backed frog, is a species of frog in the family Ranidae found in Southern Western and Eastern Ghats in the states of Kerala and Tamil Nadu, India, at elevations of 100 to 1500 meters.

References 
 Biju, Garg, Mahony, Wijayathilaka, Senevirathne & Meegaskumbura, 2014 : DNA barcoding, phylogeny and systematics of Golden-backed frogs (Hylarana, Ranidae) of the Western Ghats-Sri Lanka biodiversity hotspot, with the description of seven new species. Contributions to Zoology, 83:315 (PDF ).
Holotype: BNHS 5869, by original designation. Type locality: "Siruvani, Kuddam, Palakkad dist., Kerala state, India".

External links

 Amphibian Species of the World: Indosylvirana sreeni (Biju, Garg, Mahony, Wijayathilaka, Seneviranthne, and Meegaskumbura, 2014)
 AmphibiaWeb: Indosylvirana sreeni

Frogs of India
Amphibians described in 2014
Taxa named by Sathyabhama Das Biju
sreeni